Société tunisienne de l'électricité et du gaz (الشركة التونسية للكهرباء و الغاز) or STEG is a Tunisian public company non-administrative. Established in 1962, its mission is the production and distribution of electricity and natural gas on the Tunisian territory.
STEG is the second-largest Tunisian company by  revenues in 2009.

History 
Until August 1959, the Tunisian electricity industry was divided among eight different companies. Having decided to temporarily take over these companies, the Tunisian government site, August 15, 1958, a management committee at the head of one of these companies known as Tunisian Company of Electricity and transport. By Decree-Law No. 62-8 of 3 April 1962, the State terminates this situation by creating a public monopoly given to the STEG. 
Shortly after, an electrification policy is in place that, in forty years, the urban electrification rate of 20% passed nearly 100% and the rural electrification rate from 6% to 99% .

Production 
STEG has a park in 2011 production of 24 production units with a total capacity of 3,526 MW, powered by 82% natural gas.

References 

 STEG

Energy companies of Tunisia
Energy companies established in 1962
Non-renewable resource companies established in 1962
1962 establishments in Tunisia
Government-owned energy companies
Government-owned companies of Tunisia